There have been six baronetcies created for members of the Corbet family, four in the Baronetage of England, one in the Baronetage of Great Britain and one in the Baronetage of the United Kingdom. All creations are extinct. The recipients were descendants of the ancient Norman family of Corbet which held substantial estates in Shropshire including Wattlesborough, Caus Castle, Moreton Corbet Castle and Acton Reynald Hall.

Corbet baronets, of Sprowston (1623)
The Corbet Baronetcy, of Sprowston in the County of Norfolk, was created in the Baronetage of England on 4 July 1623 for John Corbet, of Sprowston, grandson of Sir Miles Corbet, Kt, of Moreton Corbet and son of Sir Thomas Corbet, Kt, High Sheriff of Norfolk in 1612. He sat as Member of Parliament for Norfolk and Yarmouth. He was the elder brother of the regicide Miles Corbet. The title became extinct on the death of the third Baronet in 1661.  
Sir John Corbet, 1st Baronet (1591–1628)
Sir John Corbet, 2nd Baronet (died before 1649)
Sir Thomas Corbet, 3rd Baronet (died 1661)

Corbet baronets of Stoke upon Tern (1627; First creation)
The Corbet Baronetcy, of Stoke upon Tern in the County of Shropshire, was created in the Baronetage of England on 19 September 1627 for John Corbet, great-grandson of Sir Robert Corbet, High Sheriff of Shropshire, of Moreton Corbet. He subsequently represented Shropshire in the Long Parliament. The fourth Baronet also represented this constituency in the House of Commons while the fifth Baronet represented both Montgomery and Ludlow. The title became extinct on the death of the sixth Baronet in 1750. However, it was revived in 1786 for the latter's nephew (see below).
Sir John Corbet, 1st Baronet (1594–1662)
Sir John Corbet, 2nd Baronet (–1665)
Sir John Corbet, 3rd Baronet (c. 1645–1695)
Sir Robert Corbet, 4th Baronet (c. 1670–1740)
Sir William Corbet, 5th Baronet (1702–1748)
Sir Henry Corbet, 6th Baronet (died 1750)

Corbet baronets, of Moreton Corbet (1642; First creation)
The Corbet Baronetcy, of Moreton Corbet in the County of Shropshire, was created in the Baronetage of England on 29 January 1642 for Royalist Vincent Corbet, great-great-grandson of Sir Robert Corbet, Kt, of Moreton Corbet Castle, and great grandson of Sir Andrew Corbet (died 1578). Both he and the second Baronet sat as Members of Parliament for Shropshire. The title became extinct on the death of the third Baronet in 1688. However, it was revived in 1828 for a descendant of a brother of the first Baronet (see below). Sarah, Lady Corbet, widow of the first Baronet, was created Viscountess Corbet for life in the Peerage of England in 1679.
Sir Vincent Corbet, 1st Baronet (1617–1656)
Sir Vincent Corbet, 2nd Baronet (c. 1642–1681)
Sir Vincent Corbet, 3rd Baronet (1670–1688)

Corbet baronets, of Leighton (1642)
The Corbet Baronetcy, of Leighton in the County of Montgomery, was created in the Baronetage of England on 20 June 1642 for Edward Corbet, a descendant of Sir Robert Corbet, of Caus Castle. The second and fourth Baronets both represented Shrewsbury in Parliament. The title is believed to have become extinct on the latter's death in 1774.
Sir Edward Corbet, 1st Baronet (died 1655)
Sir Richard Corbet, 2nd Baronet (1640–1683)
Sir Uvedale Corbet, 3rd Baronet (1668–1701)
Sir Richard Corbet, 4th Baronet (1696–1774)

Corbet baronets, of Stoke upon Tern (1786; Second creation)
The Corbet Baronetcy, of Stoke upon Tern in the County of Shropshire, was created in the Baronetage of Great Britain on 27 June 1786 for Corbet Corbet. Born Corbet D'Avenant, he was the son of Anne Corbet, daughter of the fourth Baronet of the 1627 creation (see above). He was heir to his uncle the sixth Baronet of the 1627 creation and changed his surname to Corbet under the terms of his uncle's will upon inheritance. The title became extinct on his death in 1823.
Sir Corbet Corbet, 1st Baronet (1752–1823)

Corbet baronets of Moreton Corbet (1808; Second creation)

The Corbet Baronetcy, of Moreton Corbet in the County of Shropshire and of Linslade in the County of Buckingham, was created in the Baronetage of the United Kingdom on 3 October 1828 for Andrew Corbet, great-great-grandson of Richard Corbet, of Shawbury, brother of the first Baronet of the 1642 creation (see above). The first baronet was High Sheriff of Shropshire in 1798 and the third Baronet was High Sheriff of Shropshire in 1862. The seventh Baronet was a member of the Shropshire County Council and High Sheriff of Shropshire in 1966. The title became extinct on his death in 1996.
Sir Andrew Corbet, 1st Baronet (1766–1835)
Sir Andrew Vincent Corbet, 2nd Baronet (1800–1855)
Sir Vincent Rowland Corbet, 3rd Baronet (1821–1891)
Sir Walter Orlando Corbet, 4th Baronet (1856–1910)
Sir Roland James Corbet, 5th Baronet (1892–1915)
Sir Gerald Vincent Corbet, 6th Baronet (1868–1955)
Sir John Vincent Corbet, 7th Baronet (1911–1996)

See also
Astley-Corbett baronets
Corbet family

References

 A Genealogical and Heraldic History of the Extinct and Dormant Baronetcies of England Ireland and Scotland John and John Bernard Burke (1844) 2nd Ed pp132–4 Google Books
Kidd, Charles, Williamson, David (editors). Debrett's Peerage and Baronetage (1990 edition). New York: St Martin's Press, 1990.

Extinct baronetcies in the Baronetage of England
Extinct baronetcies in the Baronetage of Great Britain
Extinct baronetcies in the Baronetage of the United Kingdom
1623 establishments in England